A property tax (whose rate is expressed as a percentage or per mille, also called millage) is an ad valorem tax on the value of a property.

The tax is levied by the governing authority of the jurisdiction in which the property is located. This can be a national government, a federated state, a county or geographical region or a municipality. Multiple jurisdictions may tax the same property.

Often a property tax is levied on real estate. It may be imposed annually or at the time of a real estate transaction, such as in real estate transfer tax.
This tax can be contrasted to a rent tax, which is based on rental income or imputed rent, and a land value tax, which is a levy on the value of land, excluding the value of buildings and other improvements.

Under a property-tax system, the government requires or performs an appraisal of the monetary value of each property, and tax is assessed in proportion to that value.

Type 
The four broad types of property taxes are land, improvements to land (immovable man-made objects, such as buildings), personal property (movable man-made objects) and intangible property. Real property (also called real estate or realty) is the combination of land and improvements.

Forms of property tax vary across jurisdictions. Real property is often taxed based on its class. Classification is the grouping of properties based on similar use. Properties in different classes are taxed at different rates. Examples of property classes are residential, commercial, industrial and vacant real property. In Israel, for example, property tax rates are double for vacant apartments versus occupied apartments.  France has a tax on vacant properties, which successfully reduced the vacancy rate.

A special assessment tax is sometimes confused with property tax. These are two distinct forms of taxation: one (ad valorem tax) relies upon the fair market value of the property. The other (special assessment) relies upon a special enhancement called a "benefit" for its justification.

The property tax rate is typically given as a percentage. It may be expressed as a per mil (amount of tax per thousand currency units of property value), which is also known as a millage rate or mill (one-thousandth of a currency unit). To calculate the property tax, the authority multiplies the assessed value by the mill rate and then divides by 1,000.

By jurisdiction

Property classes, tax rates, assessment rules and valuations vary by jurisdiction.

Armenia

Comparatively, Armenia ranks low internationally in terms of property tax to GDP ratio. Currently, it is 0.2% compared to the 2% global average. Based on the new amendments in the tax code, from 2021 property taxes are calculated based on market value prices, separately for apartments and residential houses. The new amendment removed the previously existing non-taxable property threshold, putting a minimum of 0.05% property tax.

Real Estate Tax Rate on Residential Houses and Country Houses:
 Up to 7 mln AMD inclusive – 0.05%
 7–23 mln AMD inclusive – 3.500 AMD + 0.1% of tax base amount exceeding 7 mln AMD
 23–50 mln AMD inclusive – 19.500 AMD + 0.2% of tax base amount exceeding 23 mln AMD
 50–85 mln AMD inclusive – 73.500 AMD + 0.4% of tax base amount exceeding 50 mln AMD
 85–120 mln AMD inclusive – 213.500 AMD + 0.6% of tax base amount exceeding 85 mln AMD
 120–200 mln AMD inclusive – 423.500 AMD + 1% of tax base amount exceeding 120 mln AMD
 More than 200 mln AMD – 1.223.500 AMD + 1.5% of tax base amount exceeding 200 mln AMD

Real Estate Tax Rate on Apartment building, Apartments and Non-Residential Areas:
 Up to 10 mln AMD inclusive – 0.05%
 10–25 mln AMD inclusive – 5.000 AMD + 0.1% of tax base amount exceeding 10 mln AMD
 25–47 mln AMD inclusive – 20.000 AMD + 0.2% of tax base amount exceeding 25 mln AMD
 47–75 mln AMD inclusive – 64.000 AMD + 0.4% of tax base amount exceeding 47 mln AMD
 75–100 mln AMD inclusive – 176.000 AMD + 0.6% of tax base amount exceeding 75 mln AMD
 100–200 mln AMD inclusive – 326.000 AMD + 1% of tax base amount exceeding 100 mln AMD
 More than 200 mln AMD – 1.326.000 AMD + 1.5% of tax base amount exceeding 200 mln AMD

Australia
Australian property is taxed at both the state and council (local municipal) level. Taxes are payable by property owners – there is no property tax charged to renters.

A state tax commonly called "stamp duty" is assessed when property is purchased or transferred.  It is typically around 5% of the purchase price, payable by the purchaser.  Other transfer charges may also apply, including special fees for investors from overseas.

"Land tax" – also a state tax – is assessed every year on a property's value.  Most Australians do not pay land tax, as most states provide a land tax exemption for the primary home or residence.  Depending on the state, surcharge tax rates can apply to foreign owners.

"Council rates" is a municipal tax levied by local government.  This is assessed each year on a property's value.  Council rates are around $1300 per annum for an average Australian household.

Brazil
Brazil is a Federation Republic, and its federated entities (internal States and Municipalities), as well as the Federal government, levy property taxes. They are all declared in the Federal Constitution.

These are the current property taxes:
 Tax on Rural Territorial Property (Imposto Territorial Rural - ITR) – federal: levied upon real state property on rural areas;
 Tax on Urban Territorial Property (Imposto Predial e Territorial Urbano - IPTU) – municipal: levied upon real state property on urban areas;
 Tax on Motorized Vehicles Property (Imposto sobre Propriedades de Veículos Automotores - IPVA) – state: levied upon the property of cars, trucks, motorcycles, and the likes;
 Tax on Large Fortunes (Imposto sobre Grandes Fortunas) – federal: it is declared on the Federal Constitution, but there is still no regulation defining its incidence.

Canada

Many provinces levy property tax on real estate based upon land use and value. This is the major source of revenue for most municipal governments. While property tax levels vary across municipalities, a common property assessment or valuation criterion is laid out in provincial legislation. The trend is to use a market value standard for valuation purposes with varying revaluation cycles. Multiple provinces established an annual reassessment cycle where market activity warrants, while others have longer periods between valuation periods. There are two types of property tax: annual property tax and land transfer tax.

Annual property taxes 
The annual property tax is usually a percentage of the taxable assessed value of the property. The taxable assessed value is commonly determined by the assessment service provider of the municipality. The annual property tax rate for any province contains at least two elements: the municipal rate and the education rate. The combination of municipal and education tax portions along with any base taxes or other special taxes determines the full amount of the tax.

 In Ontario, property tax was first introduced in 1849 with the Municipal Act (or Baldwin Act) as the act constituted a municipal structure with cities, towns, and villages along with the creation of property tax that municipalities must collect that would also support schools. The tax is calculated by multiplying the current year property-value assessed by the Municipal Property Assessment Corporation (MPAC) with the total tax rate. A study from 2019 showed that Toronto, the capital of Ontario, has the lowest property tax in the province.
 In British Columbia, the BC Assessment conducts an evaluation of properties all over British Columbia and submits assessed values for each of them yearly. BC Assessment maintains real property assessments in compliance with the Assessment Act which requires that properties be assessed as of 1 July each year. The final property tax amount is calculated by multiplying the municipal final property tax rate for the year by the BC Assessment value. Vancouver has the lowest property tax in Canada as a percentage of assessed value because while property values are extremely high, the city's budget has stayed relatively constant.
 In Alberta, property taxes have existed since 1905, when Alberta became a Province; up until 1995, all properties and land except for farmland including industrial and residential properties were assessed at market value but the adoption of the Municipal Government Act in 1995 brought along many changes to property assessments. Properties in Alberta are assessed currently every year by municipalities according to guidelines by the Ministry of Municipal Affairs and the Alberta Assessment and Property Tax Policy Unit. Property taxes in Alberta are primarily made up of two components: a municipal tax and a provincial education tax. The specific property tax rate for a certain year depends on the budget of the municipality and its total assessment base, and Education property tax rates are also set by municipalities.
 In Saskatchewan, properties are assessed by the assessment service provider of the municipality which is usually the Saskatchewan Assessment Management Agency (SAMA). A taxable rate established by the province will be applied to the full value which determines the taxable assessment. For the municipal portion of the tax, the municipal mill rate (1 mill = 0.001) will be multiplied by the total taxable assessment then multiplied by the mill rate factor for determining the amount. There is a set education mill rate established by the province for all municipalities, and no mill rate factor is applied to it. The combination of municipal and education tax portions along with any base taxes or other special taxes determines the full amount of the tax.
 In Manitoba, property value assessments are conducted by the provincial assessment services delivered through 10 district offices with the exception of Winnipeg, which has their assessment conducted by the City of Winnipeg only. Each class of property will have a different sized portion of their assessed value that is taxable. The property tax in Manitoba is made out of four parts: a municipal rate, a provincial Education rate, a School Division rate, and additional taxes for local services as needed. Every year, the education tax is set by the provincial Minister of Education while the rest is set by the City Council; the rates are expressed in mills.
 In Québec, value assessments are conducted by the respective regional county municipality (municipalité régionale de comté) every three years. Regional county municipalities were established in 1979 to deal primarily with land use. In Québec property tax is usually based on the assessed value of a property and the residential property tax rate. Properties are assessed using a market value-based approach. For residential properties, the sales of similar properties are compared to determine a valuation for the property. In unique circumstances, a cost approach is used where the cost of the property, if someone were to rebuild it, is given a valuation minus depreciation. For properties that are intended for generating income, an income approach is used to assess the market value. In this province, property taxes are used to pay for services such as the fire and police department, public transportation, as well as elementary and secondary education.

Land transfer tax
Land transfer tax is a provincial tax levied when purchasing a home or land in Canada. All provinces have a land transfer tax, except Alberta and Saskatchewan. In most provinces, the tax is calculated as a percentage of the purchase price.  In Toronto there is an additional municipal tax.

Ontario, British Columbia, Prince Edward Island, Montreal, and the City of Toronto offer land transfer tax rebates for first-time homebuyers.

British Columbia
An additional 15% tax that applies only to non-resident foreign home buyers in Greater Vancouver started on 2 August 2016. Later in 2018 this was raised to 20%. The definition of foreign buyer includes international students and temporary foreign workers. Anti-avoidance measures include fines of $100,000 for individuals and $200,000 for corporations.

First time home buyers program
The First Time Home Buyers Program is a program by the BC government that offers qualifying first-time homebuyers a reduction or elimination of the property transfer tax. It can be used in conjunction with the B.C. Home Owner Mortgage and Equity Partnership.

The First Time Home Buyers Tax Credit is also available in Ontario, which offers First Time Home Buyers a 750 dollar tax Rebate. In 2017 the Ontario Government also released the Land Transfer Tax Rebate, which allowed for up to 4,000 dollar rebate – ensuring that first time home buyers of homes valued under 368,000 dollars would not pay land transfer tax.

New home exemption
The Newly Built Home Exemption is a program that reduces or eliminates the property transfer tax on new homes. It can be used in conjunction with the B.C. Home Owner Mortgage and Equity Partnership.

Chile
The land property tax, called "territorial tax" or "contribution", is an annual amount paid quarterly by the property's owner. It is determined as a percentage of the property's "fiscal value", which is calculated by the Internal Revenue Service, based on the property's land and built area, construction materials, age, and use. The fiscal value, which is usually much lower than the market value, may be disputed by the owner. The annual levy varies between 1 and 2% of this value, depending on the property's use (residential, agricultural or commercial). Residential properties valued below  (as of 2013) are not taxed; those above that threshold are taxed only on the amount exceeding . Revenues go to the municipality administering the property's commune. All municipalities contribute a share of the revenue to a "common municipal fund" that is then redistributed back to municipalities according to a their needs (commune's poverty rate, etc.). Additionally, municipalities charge a quarterly trash collection tax, which is often paid together with the territorial tax (if applicable).

Egypt 
The law imposes a tax on each property. Public buildings are excluded (such as government buildings), as are religious buildings (mosques and churches). Families owning private properties worth up to £E2 million ($290,000) are exempt. Commercial stores with an annual rent value over £E1,200 are not exempt.

France

In France, the property tax is a local tax payable by all owners of real estate located in France. This tax is used to finance the budget of local authorities.
The property tax comprises three different taxes: the tax on built properties, the tax on unbuilt properties, and a tax on household waste removal.

Taxe d'Habitation is a local tax that must be paid by either the owner of a French property or the long-term tenant who is occupying it on January 1st of the tax year. The responsibility for payment depends on whether the property is rented furnished or unfurnished, and whether the rental is long-term or short-term.

If the property is rented unfurnished or furnished on a long-term basis, the tenant is responsible for paying the tax. However, if the property is rented out on a short-term basis, the owner is responsible for paying the tax. For leaseback properties, the management company that sub-lets the property is responsible for payment.

In summary, if you let out a property on an annual basis, the tenant is responsible for paying the Taxe d'Habitation, regardless of whether the property is furnished or unfurnished. This tax is based on various factors specific to the property, such as its location, and is determined by the local municipality, which means the amount of the tax can vary considerably.

Property tax on built properties

This is the most common tax in France. It is detailed in Article 1380 of the General Tax Code. Since it is a local tax, the property tax of built properties has a census role. The tax authorities count the new owners every year.
Two conditions must be met to be subject to this tax: The property must be irremovable and must fall into the category of real buildings.

This tax therefore applies to the following goods:

 Installations intended to shelter people: house, apartment, loft, chalet, villa, etc.
 Parkings
 Industrial or commercial installations: hangar, workshop, premises etc.
 Work of art
 Telecommunications channels
 Boats used at a fixed point
 Soils of all types of buildings and land forming an essential and immediate dependency of these constructions

Property tax on non-built properties

This tax concerns land that is not used for residential purposes.

It applies to the following goods:

 Land and greenhouses assigned to an agricultural operation
 Bodies of water, marshes and salt marshes
 Quarries, mines and peatlands
 Soils of built properties, rural buildings, courtyards and outbuildings
 Golf courses, without constructions, commercially operated or not
 Private roads, gardens and parks, etc.
 Land occupied by railways

Responsible for property tax

The owner, not tenant, of the property must pay the tax. The owner liable for property tax can be an individual, company or legal entity (commercial company or real estate company). The tax is due each year from taxpayers who own property on 1 January of the tax year. If the property is sold during the year, the seller can ask for the tax to be shared with the buyer.

Specific situations:

 In the case of a dismemberment of the property right, it is the usufructuary who is liable for the property tax.
 In the event of joint ownership, the property tax is established in the name of all joint owners
 If a condominium real estate company is liable for property tax, then the taxation is established in the name of each partner in proportion to their share.

Calculation of property tax and payment

The calculation of the property tax is based on three components:

 The cadastral rental value: This value corresponds to the theoretical amount that could be applied if the property was rented.
 The revaluation coefficient: This coefficient is voted each year by the government.
 The tax rate voted by the local authorities: This rate is voted each year by the municipalities.

The amount of property tax is equal to the tax base x the tax rate voted by the municipality.

The tax base is equal to 50% of the cadastral rental value of the property (For non-built properties, this tax base is equal to 80%). To this base is then applied the revaluation coefficient. (It stood at 1.012 for 2020).

The payment of the property tax is usually made before mid-October. The tax notice is drawn up in the name of the owner who is the only person liable for the property tax. The precise deadline for paying it varies depending on the method of payment chosen.

Exemption from property tax

In certain situations the property tax allows exemptions. The conditions of this exemption may depend on the property or the situation of the owner.

 New housing is subject to a 2-year temporary exemption.
 New constructions occupied by low-rent housing are subject to a 15-year temporary exemption.
 Old dwellings that have undergone energy renovation work are subject to a 5-year temporary exemption.
 Owners over the age of 75 whose reference tax income is capped are exempt for life. (For 2019, the reference tax income must not exceed 11,098 euros for the first part of the family quotient)

Certain properties are permanently exempt:

 The properties of the State and of the various public authorities
 Public works established for the distribution of drinking water
 State-owned buildings used for worship
 Fixed assets intended for the production of electricity from photovoltaic sources

There are also exemptions for unbuilt properties.
For example, land sown, planted or replanted with wood can be 100% exempt for a period ranging from 10 to 50 years depending on the plantations.

In 1999, France introduced a tax on vacant properties. It reduced the vacancy rate by 13%.

Germany
Real Property Tax

In Germany, the legal basis for the property tax is the so called Grundsteuergesetz (GrStG), that is the property tax law, according to which real property is classified into the following two categories (§2 GrStG):

 Real property utilised for agriculture and forestry
 Constructible real property or real property with buildings.
The tax rate is dependent on the category the respective real property falls into. The tax burden is calculated by multiplying the value of the real property according to the official assessment code (Bewertungsgesetz) with the real property tax rate and with the applicable municipal multiplier. The real property property tax rate is set by the Federal state, in which the respective real property is located. It ranges from 0.26 to 1 percent. The municipal multiplier is set by each municipality.

Real Property Tax Revenue

The revenue of property taxes amounts to almost 15 billion euros annually and benefits the municipalities for whom the property tax is among the most important sources of income. This is because the property tax revenues are utilised on a municipal level to finance public facilities such as schools, libraries, daycare centers and local infrastructure projects.

Real Property Tax Reform 

In 2018, the Federal Constitutional Court ruled that the system of property tax assessment is unconstitutional since it treated similar properties differently and thus resulted in a violation of Article 3 (equality before the law) of the  Basic Law for the Federal Republic of Germany.  So far, the calculation of property tax has been based on decades-old standard  values. In the federal states of the former West Germany these standard values were last established in 1964, whereas the standard values of the former East Germany were last determined in 1935. Accordingly, these standard values do not reflect the development of the real properties´ market values. Therefore, the Federal Constitutional Court declared that the  standard values lead to unequal tax treatment. Consequently, the German parliament had to enact a property tax reform, which entered into force in 2022. As a result, all property owners were obliged to submit a reassessment of their property values as of 1 January 2022 to the fiscal authorities by 31 January 2023. Property taxes calculated in accordance with these new values will be levied from 1 January 2025 onwards. In addition, the real property tax reform grants municipalities the right to set an increased rate of assessment on undeveloped, ready-to-build land from 2025 onwards for urban development reasons.

Real Property Tax Exemptions 

According to the German property tax law (§3 GrSTG) certain legal entities are exempt from property taxation. These include entities from the public sector like federal, state, and municipal authorities, as well as public institutions and foundations under public law, if they use the property for public purposes only. An exemption from property taxation is also made for non-profit organisations, that pursue exclusively and directly charitable, religious, cultural, scientific, or educational purposes. Besides, churches and other religious communities are exempt from property taxation if the property is used exclusively for religious or charitable purposes.

Real Property Transfer Tax

The real property transfer tax (Grunderwerbssteuer) is imposed when a domestic property is sold or when the ownership is subject to change. The tax rate is set by the federal state in which the property is located. It ranges from 3.5 to 6.5 percent. It is a one-time payment which is levied on properties whose purchase price exceeds EUR 2.500 and is typically paid for by the buyer. The real property transfer tax is also levied if at least 95 percent interests in a partnership are transferred to new partners within five years or if at least 95 percent of the shares of a company, which owns a property, is transferred to a new shareholder.

Greece
Greece has a Municipal and a Government property tax. The municipal property tax (ΤΑΠ/ΔΤ/ΔΦ) is included in electricity bills and incorporates, among others, charges for street cleaning and lighting. The Government property tax (ENFIA) is a combination of the individual asset's tax based upon floor-area and a progressive real-estate wealth tax per individual which is based on the estimated net-worth of all properties and can reach 2%.

Hong Kong
In Hong Kong, the "property tax" is not an ad valorem tax; it is actually an income tax.

According to HK Inland Revenue Ordinance IRO s5B, property owners must pay this tax only if they received a consideration such as rental income for the year of assessment. The property tax is computed on the net assessable value at the standard rate. The period of assessment is from 1 April to 31 March.

Net assessable value
The formula is:

Net assessable value = 80% of Assessable value.

HK property tax payable = Net assessment value X Property tax standard rate

Assessable value = Rental income + Premium + (Rental bad debt recovered — Irrecoverable rent) – Rates paid by owner.

India
Property taxes are levied by either state government or local civic bodies. Property tax or 'house tax' is a local tax on buildings, along with appurtenant land. It is imposed on the Possessor (not the custodian of property as per 1978, 44th amendment of the constitution). It resembles the US-type wealth tax and differs from the excise-type UK rate. The tax power is vested in the states and is delegated to local bodies, specifying the valuation method, rate band, and collection procedures. The tax base is the annual rental value (ARV) or area-based rating. Owner-occupied and other properties not producing rent are assessed on cost and then converted into ARV by applying a percentage of cost, usually four percent.  Most big-city municipals have tax on vacant lands, and other smaller cities and rural areas don't have any property tax on vacant lands. In most cases, civic bodies have taxes exempted on all the buildings and lands used for: religious worship by the public; public burial & cremation; or charitable & educational purposes. Some agricultural or heritage lands are also exempt. Other than that, Central government properties are exempt. Instead, a "service charge" is permissible under executive order. Properties of foreign missions also enjoy tax exemption without requiring reciprocity. The tax is usually accompanied by service taxes, e.g., water tax, drainage tax, conservancy (sanitation) tax, lighting tax, all using the same tax base. The rate structure is flat on rural (panchayat) properties, but in the urban (municipal) areas it is mildly progressive with about 80% of assessments falling in the first two brackets.

Below are details of certain local civic bodies:

Ireland

A Local Property Tax came into effect in the Republic of Ireland on 1 July 2013, and is collected by the Revenue Commissioners. The tax is on residential properties. The property owner is liable (though in the case of leases for longer than twenty years, the tenant is liable). The revenue funds the provision of services by local authorities. Such services include public parks, libraries, open spaces and leisure amenities, planning and development, fire and emergency services, maintenance, and street cleaning and lighting.

The tax is based upon market value, taxed via a system of market bands.  the initial national central rate of the tax is 0.18% of a property's value up to €1 million. Properties valued over €1 million are assessed 0.25% on the excess. From 1 January 2015 local authorities can vary LPT rates at up to 15% below or above the national central rate.

In the case of properties valued over €1 million, no banding applies – 0.18% is charged on the first €1 million (€1,800) and 0.25% on the balance. The government estimates that 85% to 90% of all properties fall within the first five taxation bands.

Jamaica 
This tax is paid annually and is based on a percentage of the unimproved value of a property.

Lithuania 
The tax period for a property tax is a calendar year. Property tax rate ranging from 0.3% to 1% the tax value of real estate is determined by the municipality.

Since 1 January 2015 if the person's property value is higher than 220,000 euros, then a 0.5 per cent tax applies to the excess.

Luxembourg
Property tax in Luxembourg is calculated on the basis of the property's "unitary value" determined by tax authorities and levied by the communes. The tax is calculated as property unitary value * assessment rate * communal rate. The assessment rate is determined by the legislator and generally ranges from 0.7% to 1%. The communal rate is set by the communal authority and varies from 120% to 900% depending on the municipality.

Luxembourg has minimal property taxes compared to its neighbours in Benelux or in the European Union. It amounts to more or less €150 for a €500,000 apartment in Luxembourg City.

Czech Republic

There are two types of property tax in the Czech Republic: tax on estate and tax on real estate.

The subjects of the tax on estate are all estates in the legislation of the Czech Republic excepting particular exceptions: estates which are covered by taxed real estates (these estates are not taxed only on that part where the real estate is located), forests, body of water, estates with the goal of defence the country. The payer of the tax is the owner on this particular estate. There are different types of taxes on estate depending on purpose (fields have lower coefficient than estates denoted for industry). There is a difference in the tax on building sites. Building sides with no real estate on it have constant coefficient 2 Kč per square metre whereas buildings sites with real property (those part of the building sites which are not covered by that particular real property) are taxed according to number of citizens and location of particular village/town/city.

The subjects of the tax on real estate are all buildings and accommodation units in the legislation of the Czech Republic apart from those buildings composed of accommodation units that are already taxed (block of flats,...). The payer is again the owner of the real estate. The tax base from buildings and accommodations units is the area of the built-up surface.

Facts for both taxes:

 All earnings stemming from property tax (paid by payers of taxes) in particular village/town/city goes via tax office back to that particular village/town/city
 Every village/town/city has an authorization for adjusting its coefficient on property tax (they are 1, 2, 3, 4, 5 – which means how many times the originally assessed tax will be multiplied)
 Tax year is the calendar year
 Tax return must be handed by the end of January of the tax year. If payer did it in the previous tax year and circumstances of taxes did not change, then the payer does not have to hand tax return and the tax is assessed automatically by the relevant authority
 Tax is in two exactly the same repayments by the end of May and November respectively. (As far as normal non businesses are concerned)

Important notion: There is a difference between the person who pays tax physically and the person holds the tax burden. In this type of tax in the Czech Republic it is always the same person, that is why it is omitted.

Moldova

Transnistria
The law in Transnistria establishes tax rates for apartments (0.3%) and houses (0.2%).

Netherlands
Property tax (Dutch: Onroerendezaakbelasting (OZB)) is levied on property on a municipal basis. Only the owners of residential property and people who rent/own commercial space are taxed. People who rent a home do not pay property tax. Municipalities combine their property taxes with a tax for garbage collection and for the sewer system. Owners and users of property and land also pay taxes based on the value of property to the water boards for flood protection and water and wastewater treatment ("waterschapsbelasting"). A percentage of the value of a house ("huurwaardeforfait") is added to the income of the owner, so the owner of a house pays more income tax. All property-related taxes are based on the value of the house estimated by the municipality.

Portugal

Portugal has divided their property taxation into two brackets, pre-purchase taxes and post-purchase taxes (of property). 

Pre-Purchase/ Purchasing Real Estate Taxes: 
If an individual is looking to buy real estate in Portugal, they can be expected to pay a multitude of taxes. First, the individual will have to pay the 'Portugal Property Transfer Tax' (as referred to as 'IMPOSTO MUNICIPAL SOBRE AS TRANSMISSÕES ONEROSAS DE IMÓVEIS). This tax is applied when there is a transfer of ownership of a certain property. The rates of this tax can range from as low as 1% and up to 8%-- these taxes are dependent on a few considerations, which include "the purchase price for the real estate, the location of the property, and whether it is the first or second home in Portugal." In addition, a 'Stamp Tax' (Imposto de Selo) will also be a prepurchase tax applied before the sale of real estate. This is one of the oldest taxes in Portugal, and it is applied to all the official paperwork, such as deeds, contracts, mortgage agreements, and bank statements that make the sale legal and 'official' according to the courts. This responsibility "is accounted for by the buyer, charged at a fixed rate of 0.8% of the property’s registered fiscal value."

Post Purchase Real Estate Taxes: 
Property Tax (also known as: “IMI – Imposto Municipal Sobre Imóveis”) is "computed on the tax registration value of urban and rural properties located in Portuguese territory." IMI is based on the type of property one possesses: "Urban property- 0.3 to 0.45%, Rural property- 0.8% Property owned by residents in offshores (except individuals)- 7.5%." There are also quite a few tax reductions and exemptions individuals can qualify/ take advantage of properties that are considered a permanent residence (only viable for three years), residencies that have an occupant with multiple dependents registered to them, property that is deemed low in value and is owned by individuals of a low socio-economic standard according to the government, property that is considered apart of the tourism circuit, property that can help with renewable energy and even stores deemed historical or culturally impactful.

Slovakia
The law in Slovakia distinguishes 3 types of the real estate tax (Slovak: Daň z nehnuteľností):
– Land tax
– Building tax
– Tax on apartments and non-residential premises in an apartment building.

The administration of real estate tax is handled by the municipality in whose territory the real estate lies. In cities with multiple city districts, the tax administration of real estate tax is handled by the department of local taxes and fees and not by the city districts. For example, Bratislava or Košice.

Origin and termination of tax liability
The tax liability arises on 1 January of the tax period following the tax period in which the taxpayer became the owner, administrator, tenant, or user of the taxable property and expires on 31 December of the tax period in which the taxpayer lost ownership, administration, lease or use of the real estate. If the taxpayer becomes the owner, administrator, tenant, or user of the real estate on 1 January, the current tax period, the tax liability arises on this day.
The decisive factor for the collection of the tax as of 1 January is one tax period. Changes in taxable facts that occur during the tax period are not taken into account.

Declaration
The tax return is filed by the taxpayer, whose law on local taxes defines separately for land, buildings, flats, and non-residential parameters. The taxpayer files a tax return for the tax period in which the tax liability was incurred. The taxpayer (i.e. the taxable person) is obliged to pay the real estate tax return to the relevant tax administrator (i.e. the Municipality) by 31 January of the liability period. In other tax periods, the tax return is not filed and the taxpayer receives a decision on the tax levied from the administrator. For example, if you acquire a property on 25 August 2019, you are required to pay the tax return by 31 January 2020. However, only if the property will be registered in the real estate cadastre on 1 January 2020. A taxpayer who acquired the property by auctioning during the tax period is obliged to state the return within 30 days from the date of the tax liability.

Co-ownership
If the land, building, flat and non-residential space in a residential building are co-owned by several persons, the declaration shall be submitted by each individual or legal person. Specifically, the co-owner should state real estate tax up to the amount of his co-ownership share. If the co-owners agree, the declaration will be submitted by a chosen representative. If this occurs all co-owners are obliged to mention this fact in the declaration. This does not apply to spouses who own land, a building, a flat, or a non-residential space in an apartment building in the non-share co-ownership of the spouses. In this case, the declaration is filed by one of the spouses.

How to proceed when filing a tax return
The tax return is filed in the prescribed documentation depending on whether it is an individual or a legal entity. To complete the documentation, it is necessary to send documents that prove changes in one's property (e.g. a copy of the decision to allow a deposit in the real estate cadastre, a decision on inheritance, etc.). Possible changes in the ownership of real estate are, for example, the sale or purchase of the real estate, inheritance, donation, building approval, removal of the building, and the like. The duly completed form must be submitted to the city or municipal office in person or appoint a representative.

Electronic services
The law does not stipulate the obligation of the municipality to finance electronic services, and thus e.g. during the tax return by electronic means while providing for the possibility of providing them. Whether it is possible to communicate with the tax administrator electronically, the municipality shall publish on its website in the form of an adopted generally binding regulation in which the details of electronic communication and provision of electronic services are laid down.

Exemption from tax
 land, buildings, flats, and non-residential premises owned by the municipality which is the tax administrator, and land, buildings, flats, and non-residential premises owned or managed by city districts in Bratislava and Košice,
 land and buildings owned by another state used by individual who have privileges and immunities under international law and are not citizens of the Slovak Republic provided that reciprocity is guaranteed,
 land and buildings or parts thereof owned by churches and religious societies registered by the state, which are used for education, scientific research purposes, or the performance of religious ceremonies,
 land and buildings or parts thereof owned by public universities or owned by the state under the administration of state universities for higher education or scientific research purposes,
 land and buildings or parts thereof owned by the state under the administration of the Slovak Academy of Sciences or owned by public research institution used for scientific research purposes,
 land and buildings or parts thereof owned by the state or self-governing regions serving kindergartens, primary education, secondary education, and higher vocational education and serving practical training centers and if they are within the founding competence of the state or self-governing regions,
 lands of publicly accessible parks owned by medical facilities providing institutional health care,
 land, buildings, and non-residential premises owned by the Slovak Red Cross.

Payment of tax
The tax administrator will send an assessment for the relevant tax period, stating the amount of tax, usually by 15 May. The levied real estate tax is payable within 15 days from the date of entry into force of the decision.

The tax administrator may also determine the payment of real estate tax in installments, while the due date of individual installments shall be determined in the decision by which the tax is levied. If the tax levied is higher than EUR 33,000, the city/municipality shall determine the payment of the tax in at least two equal installments. You can also pay the tax at once but within the first installment.

Sanctions
If you do not file a tax return for real estate tax within the deadline, the tax administrator will impose a fine up to the amount of tax levied, not less than 5 euros, but not more than 3,000 euros.

United Kingdom

In the UK the ownership of residential property or land is not taxed, a situation almost unique in the OECD. Instead, the Council Tax is usually paid by the resident of a property, and only in the case of unoccupied property does the owner become liable to pay it (although owners can often obtain a discount or an exemption for empty properties).

HM Revenue and Customs (HMRC) guidelines state:

"Council Tax is a tax on property. In principle it may be an allowable deduction in those instances where other property-based expenses are deductible."

The Valuation Tribunal Service states that:

"The tax is a mix of a property tax and a personal tax. Generally, where two or more persons reside in a dwelling the full tax is payable. If one person resides in the dwelling then 75% is payable. An empty dwelling attracts only a 50% charge unless the billing authority has made a determination otherwise."

The Council Tax depends on the value of the property, but is not calculated as a simple percentage. Instead, the property is allocated to a Council Tax band, (9 in England and 8 in Scotland and Wales). Valuation is carried out by the Valuation Office Agency under the auspices of HMRC.

Stamp Duty Land Tax (SDLT) is a progressive tax which applies when purchasing "a residential property or a piece of land in England or Northern Ireland". As of 2023, the purchase of a primary residence worth up to £250,000, by a UK resident, is tax-free with respect to SDLT. Some purchases by non-UK residents are subject to a further 2% surcharge. Purchases of non-primary residences are subject to an increased SDLT rate schedule. As of 2023, a first-time buyer of a primary residence receives SDLT relief, for properties worth up to £625,000, in the form of reduced SDLT rates (including a 0% bracket up to £425,000).

United States

In the United States, property tax on real estate is usually levied by the local government. The national government levies no real estate tax, nor property tax. State governments levy 3% of the total property tax collected. The other 97% is collected by counties, municipalities, schools, community colleges, and many other special-purpose governmental agencies, e.g. libraries, museums, parks, bridge authorities. Rates vary across the states, between about 0% and 4% of the home value. The assessment is made up of two components—the improvement or building value and the land or site value. The property tax is the main tax supporting local: education, police, fire protection, government, roads, and most infrastructure, e.g. sewers, bridges, street lights. Many state and local jurisdictions add personal property taxes. (See exceptions below.)

History of property tax

Before the presence of a monetary system, taxes were mostly paid as a percentage of crops raised. Later, the property tax of ancient world, parts of medieval Europe and American colonies was rather based on the area of the property rather than on its value. Finally, the property's gross output (e.g. annual income) were used as the base of taxation.

Ancient times

The first ever tax records, dating from about six thousand years BCE, were in the form of soil tablets which were found in city-state of Lagash (Now in the territory of current Iraq). The system was called bala (rotation). It was such that each month one particular area of city was taxed, which allowed to make such arduous task less difficult. In Ancient Egypt the taxes were levied against the value of grain, cattle, oil, beer and also land. By that time only one person out of 100 were literate. Some of these people were tax assessors. They kept records about owners of land along with its size. They collected annual data by calculating cattle and checking the crop yields. If the taxpayer was not able to pay the tax, he was brought before the court. Tax assessors were highly respected people due to their ability and skills.

Medieval times
In England in the 11th century the taxes on land were paid by peasants who rented that land from its owner. The more productive the land was the higher the rent was. During the 1070s, William the Conqueror established an early form of land taxation. It was common that cities kept records of the owner of the property. Each parcel was measured and estimated. Later, after 1215, King John was limited in his power to raise revenue, so from this point taxes could be collected only with permission of his barons.  After 1290 normal people started paying this type of tax based on the location of the property (higher for those in cities and lower for rural residents) In 16th century even the King's own land was also taxed. The King's power of taxation became even weaker right after 1689 when the new law was introduced meaning that he could not tax without Parliament's permission.

The Thirteen Colonies
Arriving in the New World, the Pilgrims landed at Plymouth and started building their city in 1620. Pilgrims formed a pact to protect themselves and also set laws including taxation and assessments. All people were allocated equal proportion of land from which they had to pay tax.

In Boston, a property tax was implemented by Puritans for paying the expenses of church and religious education. Every person paid this property tax regardless of one's religion. This particular system lasted for more than one hundred years. The assessor of the tax was the sheriff. The system of evidence was similar to England (the assessors kept records of personal estate).  The situation of the citizen was taken into account as far as the property tax was concerned – meaning that a widow with children was not only forgiven property tax but also was guaranteed to receive a certain amount of money monthly. On the other hand, people who destroyed public property had to pay the cost of repairs with property tax.

The United States

After the establishment of the United States in 1776, taxes were raised in most regions (mostly through property). Later, the central Government found out that this system did not work as far more was spent than received from this measure. At the end of the 18th century, there was a dispute between Alexander Hamilton and Thomas Jefferson. The camp of Hamilton was for raising taxes (mainly property tax) centrally in order to increase the capacity of budget (also power) of the Government. The camp of Jefferson was for raising revenue locally as it "sounded“ more like a concept of democracy. Hamilton had a strong head for finance; he helped to establish the capitalist system that exists today. However, the financial strategy mentioned above (high property tax) was a disaster for him.
Higher taxes (especially property) was finally established during the concerns whether the war with France would happen or not.  National property tax was enacted by Congress apportioned by population. There were many protests until the tax was finally repealed. On the other hand, the trend of raising the local property tax continued as local governments were able to raise their revenue by this measure.

The 20th century
At the beginning of the 20th century it was found out that the tax system in US could not equitably tax the complicated economy. Many reforms were implemented (trying to reduce reliance on property taxes). The most important one was concerned with new narrow personal property tax was established especially for homeowners and intangible assets. Many US presidents have tried to push for lower property tax and for the implementation of income tax. 
By the time of the Great Depression, the property tax collection rates dropped as people's income decreased steeply. The Governments mostly cut property tax and implemented sales taxes. After the Great Depression, many movements were formed for addressing claims on the Government with real tax reforms. Many of these reforms were approved and remain the current law.

Criticism 

Critics of property taxes note that this type of tax demonstrates that so-called "property owners" are renters of their land and that the government is regarded as the final owner since the property owners can be evicted at any time for failure to pay this tax. For example, a resident of Southfield, Michigan, was evicted from her home for missing a $900 property tax payment.  The town refused to accept her late payment and instead confiscated and sold her nearly $300,000 home. Critics note that instances like this are a fairly frequent occurrence and demonstrate a threat to property rights, due process, and the rule of law.

Places without property tax

Middle East

Africa

North America

Europe

Oceania

United States
In Alaska, "...only a small portion of the land mass is subject to a property tax. ...only 24 municipalities in Alaska (either cities or boroughs) levy a property tax." However, the vast majority of revenue for local governments comes from property taxes. There is no tax on the private land in American Samoa, the Territory of Palmyra Island or Kingman Reef in the Pacific Ocean insular areas.

See also

 Georgism
 Henry George
 Land value tax

Notes

References

Further reading
 Slack, E., & Bird, R. M. (2014). The Political Economy of Property Tax Reform, OECD Working Papers on Fiscal Federalism 18, OECD Publishing.

Real property law